Depot Creek, also known as Brown Creek and Kokanee Creek, is a large creek in south-central British Columbia, Canada and Whatcom County, Washington, United States. It is in the Pacific Ocean drainage basin, and is located in the North Cascades. There is a waterfall along its course, Depot Creek Falls.

Name origin
Although a book on waterfalls says it was named for an old trading post near its mouth, hence the name "Depot", the British Columbia Names Office says, in light of it also being known as Brown Creek after a US Army colonel who drowned in Chilliwack Lake in 1858 and buried next to the creek, it was probably located near a supply depot of the Boundary Commission, which was active from 1858-61. The Canadian Department of Fisheries and Oceans files on this creek, say that in addition to Brown Creek, it is also known as Kokanee Creek, for a species of land-locked sockeye common in the Pacific Northwest.

Course
Depot Creek begins at an unnamed lake Whatcom County, Washington State, United States, located in a cirque between Mount Redoubt and Mount Spickard.  The creek exits the lake and flows northwest into a large, swamp-like area at the top of Depot Creek Falls. The creek then drops over the falls and reaches the bottom of the valley.  From here the creek flows northwest, passes into British Columbia, Canada, and reaches its mouth at Chilliwack Lake near the lake's south end. Chilliwack Lake flows via the Chilliwack River and the Fraser River to the Pacific Ocean. The portion of the creek in the United States is in North Cascades National Park; the lower creek and creek mouth in Canada are within Chilliwack Lake Provincial Park.

See also
List of rivers in Washington
List of British Columbia rivers

References 

Rivers of Washington (state)
Rivers of British Columbia
Rivers of Whatcom County, Washington